Laetilia dilatifasciella is a species of snout moth in the genus Laetilia. It was described by Ragonot in 1887. It is found from southern New Mexico to southern California.

The length of the forewings is 6–8 mm. Adults are pale gray with variable dark gray patches. The posterior area is tinged with ochreous tan. Adults are on wing in May and again from July to October.

The larvae are predatory on Cerococcidae, Coccidae, Dactylopiidae and Kermesidae species. Larvae can be found in May and October.

Taxonomy
The species was formerly considered a synonym of Laetilia coccidivora.

References

Moths described in 1887
Phycitini